Thambikku Entha Ooru is a 1984 Indian Tamil-language romantic comedy film directed by Rajasekhar and written by Panchu Arunachalam. The film stars Rajinikanth, Madhavi and Sulakshana. It revolves around a spoilt rich man who is forced to live in a village for one year to learn discipline. The film was released on 20 April 1984. It was later remade in Kannada as Anjada Gandu (1988).

Plot 
Balu is a lavish spendthrift with a cavalier attitude towards life. Born to a rich father Chandrasekhar, he has a rampant and aggressive behaviour and gets into confrontations wherever he perceives injustice. Worried about Balu's behaviour, Chandrasekhar decides to send him to his friend and ex-militaryman Gangadharan's village – Uthama Palayam, to work for him for one year with a condition that Balu will not reveal that he is the son of Chandrasekhar.

Balu slowly gets accustomed to the village life and learns to work hard and develops a good relation with Gangadharan and his family. During his stay, he spars with an arrogant rich girl, Sumathi. Assuming Balu to be a poor villager, she tries to humiliate him and Balu responds in kind. Eventually they both fall in love.

Gangadharan's daughter (Sulakshana) also loves with Balu, but learns he is in love with Sumathi. A dejected Sulakshana agrees to marry a man chosen by her father. Sumathi's father, who had agreed to get her married to his partner's son, rescinds the proposal on Madhavi's request. This enrages the villainous partner and he kidnaps Sumathi to marry her by force to his son. Balu rescues her and leaves her in the custody of Gangadharan's daughter and her suitor. However, the suitor betrays his trust and turns her over back to the partner and his son.

In a final fight sequence, Balu rescues Sumathi and returns her to her father. Balu then leaves the village after learning hard work, discipline and many other good virtues from Gangadharan. The final scene shows Sumathi and her father at Balu's father house discussing marriage for Sumathi. Sumathi initially refuses, but soon realizes that she is actually in Balu's house and to everyone's surprise, Balu clad in a full suit walks down the stairs.

Cast 
 Rajinikanth as Balu
 Madhavi as Sumathi
 Sulakshana as Gangadharan's daughter
Senthamarai as Gangadharan
 V. S. Raghavan as Chandrasekhar
 Vinu Chakravarthy as Sumathi's father
Srikanth
 Nizhalgal Ravi
 Janagaraj
 Master Vimal
 Ennathe Kannaiah
 Vani
 Kovai Sarala
 Sathyaraj
 T. K. S. Natarajan
Omakuchi Narasimhan

Production 
The film was initially titled Naane Raja Naane Manthiri.

Soundtrack 
The soundtrack was composed by Ilaiyaraaja and the lyrics were written by Panchu Arunachalam. The song "Aasaikliye" is based on the Carnatic raga Arabhi, while "Kadhalin Deepam Ondru" is based on the Charukesi raga. Ilaiyaraaja was hospitalised after a hernia surgery and therefore unable to sing, so he composed this song by whistling and sent the notes to his studio. During the recording and rehearsals, Ilaiyaraaja would be available over phone to make corrections, and when the song's singers S. P. Balasubrahmanyam and S. Janaki were recording, they practised the whole tune and sang it over the phone while Ilaiyaraaja made the necessary corrections. The song "En Vaazhvile" is based on "Aye Zindagi Gale Lagale" from Sadma (1983). In May 2015, the FM radio station, Radio City, commemorated Ilaiyaraaja's 72nd birthday by broadcasting the composer's songs in a special show titled Raja Rajathan for 91 days. "Kadhalin Deepam Ondru" was one of the most requested songs on the show.

References

External links 
 

1980s Tamil-language films
1984 films
1984 romantic comedy films
Films directed by Rajasekhar (director)
Films scored by Ilaiyaraaja
Films shot in Ooty
Films with screenplays by Panchu Arunachalam
Indian romantic comedy films
Tamil films remade in other languages